The Track & Field Organization is a London-based independent record label, founded in 1999 by Steven Drew, Paul Wright and Russel Duke. The label's first release was Kicker's "Said and Done" / "Chancifer" single, in April 2000, and The Tyde's debut album, Once, in March 2001.

Artists
 Beatnik Filmstars
 The Broken Family Band
 The Clientele
 Comet Gain
 Currituck Co.
 Darren Hayman
 Dressy Bessy
 The Essex Green
 Finishing School
 Great Lakes
 Herman Düne
 Homescience
 I Am the World Trade Center
 James William Hindle
 Kicker
 The Ladybug Transistor
 The Loves
 Mahogany
 of Montreal
 The Projects
 The Radio Dept.
 Saloon
 Screen Prints
 The Singing Adams
 Saint Thomas
 Tompaulin
 The Tyde

See also 
 List of record labels
 List of independent UK record labels

References

External links
Official website

British independent record labels
Record labels established in 1999
Indie rock record labels
1999 establishments in England